Kuwanimyia is a genus of flies in the family Tachinidae.

Species
K. afra Cerretti, 2009
K. atra Cerretti, 2009
K. capensis Cerretti, 2009
K. conspersa Townsend, 1916

References

Exoristinae
Diptera of Asia
Diptera of Africa
Tachinidae genera
Taxa named by Charles Henry Tyler Townsend